Yoshiki District may refer to:

 Yoshiki District, Gifu
 Yoshiki District, Yamaguchi